Dara (Persian: دارا) is an Iranian non-residential island in the Persian Gulf. The island is located in the mouth of Musa Bay. This island is a habitat for aquatic and coastal birds, including terns and coral reefs in the Persian Gulf.

References 

Islands of the Persian Gulf
Islands of Iran